Richard Carpenter may refer to:

 Richard Carpenter (theologian) (1575–1627), English clergyman and theological writer
 Richard Carpenter (ca. 1700–1750), original owner of the Belvale property in Virginia
 Richard Cromwell Carpenter (1812–1855), British 19th century architect
 Richard Carpenter (architect) (1841–1893), British Victorian architect
 Richard Carpenter (screenwriter) (1929–2012), British screenwriter and actor
 Richard Carpenter, composer of Miles Davis' "Walkin'"
 Richard Carpenter (musician) (born 1946), American musician and composer, one half of The Carpenters
 Richard Carpenter (footballer) (born 1972), English football player